Chhotu Loura represented Indian women's amateur boxing at 50 kg category and won bronze medal in 2006 Women's World Amateur Boxing Championships. Been part of India's first Women's Amateur Boxing championship.

References 

Living people
Indian women boxers
Place of birth missing (living people)
Year of birth missing (living people)
AIBA Women's World Boxing Championships medalists
Flyweight boxers
21st-century Indian women